Mohamed Sathak Engineering College is the engineering college in Tamil Nadu started in the year 1984. It is sponsored by the Mohamed Sathak Trust of Chennai. The College had started functioning in early October 1984. AICTE had approved all the Courses being conducted by this institution.

External links

Engineering colleges in Tamil Nadu
Colleges affiliated to Anna University
Ramanathapuram district
Educational institutions established in 1984
1984 establishments in Tamil Nadu